The Menorquín or  is a breed of horse indigenous to the island of Menorca in the Balearic Islands, from which it takes its name. It is closely associated with the doma menorquina style of riding.

History 

Menorca was under Moorish domination from 903 to 1287. According some sources, research has shown links between the Menorquín and Arab breeds, while others have shown it to be of Berber origin, and yet others believe that it was brought to Menorca from central Europe by King James I of Aragon. According to the Government of the Balearic Islands, it belongs to the eastern group of indigenous Iberian horses which also included the now extinct Catalan horse.

The FAO lists it as "endangered". In April 2011 the total population was reported to be 2995, of which fewer than 200 were outside the Balearic Islands.

The breed has remained agile and slender as it was not employed for agricultural work, for which the Balearic donkey was traditionally used.

Characteristics 

The Menorquín may only be black, in all its variations; horses of any other colour cannot be registered. Limited white markings are permitted. It is harmoniously made, tranquil and obedient, noble and elegant. The profile is slightly convex, the body and limbs long, the eye round and lively. It is strong and energetic, slender, powerful and muscular and suited to any type of saddle or driving use.

See also
Mallorquín

References

Horse breeds
Horse breeds originating in Spain